Duke Wen of Chen (reigned 754 BC – died 745 BC) was the eleventh ruler of the ancient Chinese state of Chen during the early Spring and Autumn period. His given name was Yu (圉), and Wen was his posthumous name.

Duke Wen succeeded his father Duke Ping of Chen, who died in 755 BC. He reigned for 10 years and died in 745 BC. He was succeeded by his son Bao, known as Duke Huan of Chen. When Duke Huan died in 707 BC, his younger brother Chen Tuo murdered Crown Prince Mian and usurped the throne of Chen. Chen Tuo was then killed by the army of the neighbouring State of Cai, which restored the throne to Duke Huan's younger son Yue, known as Duke Li of Chen.

Duke Zhuang of the state of Wey married two princesses of Chen, Li Gui and her younger sister Dai Gui, who were likely daughters of Duke Wen of Chen. Dai Gui was the mother of Duke Huan of Wey.

References

Bibliography

Monarchs of Chen (state)
8th-century BC Chinese monarchs
745 BC deaths